"Adieu" (French for Goodbye) is a song by German industrial metal band Rammstein, released as the fifth single from their eighth studio album Zeit.

Music video 
A music video for the song was released on 24 November 2022.

Track listing

Charts

References

2022 songs
Rammstein songs